"Bang Bang Boom" is a song by Canadian pop rock band the Moffatts. It was released in July 2000 as the first single from their fourth and final album, Submodalities. The song was a hit in Canada, reaching number one on Canada's RPM Top Singles chart. It also became a minor hit in Germany, peaking at number 71 on the German Singles Chart and spending seven weeks in the top 100.

Beginning November 2012, the song–with altered composition and lyrics–was featured in LG's online campaign, "Life's Good".

Music video
The music video for "Bang Bang Boom" reached number one on MuchMusic Countdown for two weeks. It features the band performing at a house party.

Track listing
CD-maxi
 "Bang Bang Boom" – 2:59
 "All The Answers" – 6:49
 "Two Beats" – 3:28

Charts

References

External links
 

2000 singles
2000 songs
EMI Records singles
The Moffatts songs
RPM Top Singles number-one singles
Song recordings produced by Bob Rock